Ben Tansey was the son of Bernard Tansey and Kathleen Glynn of Caltraghduff, Ballyforan, County Roscommon. Tansey played senior intercounty football and hurling for two different counties, Roscommon and Meath.

Tansey started playing hurling and football with his local clubs, Four Roads and St Aidan's in Roscommon. He won underage hurling championships with Four Roads and also a U16"B" All-Ireland hurling medal with Roscommon. He played Minor and Under 21 football and hurling for Roscommon. Tansey went to Ballinafad College, in Mayo, where he played in four Connacht colleges hurling finals, won a Connacht colleges football medal and a Mayo colleges football championship.
Tansey joined the Garda Síochána in 1973 and was stationed in Rush, Dublin, Balbriggan, and Navan. He served in Navan for 27 years until his retirement in 2003.

During his playing days in Roscommon Tansey won a Connacht Senior Football Championship in 1978 and an All-Ireland Junior Hurling Championship in 1974. Tansey is one of an elite group of Roscommon hurlers to have played Railway Cup with Connacht. He won 2 Roscommon Senior Hurling Championships with Four Roads and also a Connacht Senior Club Hurling Championship medal in 1977. He won an Intermediate Football Championship with St Aidan's and was also club footballer of the year in 1975.

Tansey transferred to Navan O'Mahony's in 1979. With them he won 7 Meath Senior Football Championships and 2 Meath Senior Hurling Championships, being a member of the double winning team in 1985. He also won 2 Intermediate Hurling Championships and several Feis Cup and League football medals. He was also club footballer of the year and club hurler of the year. Tansey also holds the distinction of having won "Man of the Match" awards in both senior football(1979) and senior hurling(1986) finals. He was the Keegan Cup winning captain in 1981. Tansey last lined out for O'Mahony's in the Intermediate Hurling Final in 1996, aged 43, rounding off a 26 year club career with 15 club championship medals.

Tansey is best remembered in Meath for being an intercounty Dual player. In particular for goals he scored in Croke Park in the Leinster Senior Football Championship against Dublin in 1983 and 1984. The goal he scored in the Leinster Final in 1984 would be the only one conceded by John O'Leary in the championship that year. Tansey was Meath senior footballer of the year in 1982 and won an O'Byrne Cup medal in 1983. Tansey was on Meath hurling and football teams that were managed by Seán Boylan.

Tansey was highly regarded in Navan as a hurling coach and coached teams at all grades. He was player/coach for the 2 senior hurling championships he won and was immensely proud to have been involved in several O'Mahony's juvenile team that travelled to Feile na nGael competitions.

Tansey was interested in many other sports, such as handball, squash, fishing and pitch and putt. He played competitive basketball for Navan O'Mahony's, competitive soccer with Navan Gardaí in the early days of the Meath and District League and also lined out at full back for Navan R.F.C. on several occasions. After his G.A.A. days he became a member of the Royal Tara Golf Club and represented the club in competitions. He played off a handicap of 5 and once held the course record.

As well as having the distinction of being a dual player with two different counties Ben also had two uncles with unique records. John Glynn played Connacht senior football championship with 3 different counties, his native Galway, Sligo and Leitrim. His brother Tim Glynn played Munster senior hurling championship with 2 different counties, his native Galway and Limerick, he also played Junior hurling with Kerry & Junior football with Limerick. Other brothers, Martin, Tom & Frank Glynn also played hurling with Galway. Tansey also had 2 aunts who played in an All-Ireland Camogie final for Galway against Antrim in 1946. His cousin Sheila Coen played with the Galway camogie team in the 90's.

References 

 http://www.hoganstand.com/ArticleForm.aspx?ID=145189
 https://web.archive.org/web/20111005165651/http://www.roscommonpeople.ie/itemdetail.asp?itemID=17645&menu=d17645
 http://www.meathchronicle.ie/news/obituaries/articles/2011/03/30/4004049-obituaries-02042011/print
 http://www.meathchronicle.ie/sport/roundup/articles/2010/12/22/4002290-navan-omahonys-honour-great-hurling-and-football-teams-from-25-years-ago
 http://www.independent.ie/sport/gaelic-football/new-culture-of-blame-spells-disaster-for-fermanagh-2607453.html
 http://www.rte.ie/sport/gaa/championship/mediaplayer.html?features,2931769,2931769,flash,257
 https://web.archive.org/web/20111002095812/http://www.meathchronicle.ie/articles/1/32165
 http://www.thefreelibrary.com/Royals+lose+two+greats+of+the+game.-a0252691468
 http://www.galwaycamogie.net/past_senior.asp
 https://web.archive.org/web/20110219081305/http://fourroads.roscommon.gaa.ie/clubhistory.html
 https://web.archive.org/web/20110518201815/http://www.hoganstand.com/Roscommon/Profile.aspx
 https://web.archive.org/web/20110518224418/http://www.hoganstand.com/Meath/Titles.aspx#captains
 http://www.irishcentral.com/story/sport/cathal_dervan/dublin-hurling-surge-is-deserved-120278634.html

1953 births
2011 deaths
Dual players
Garda Síochána officers
Galway Gaelic footballers
Roscommon inter-county Gaelic footballers
Meath inter-county Gaelic footballers
Roscommon inter-county hurlers
Meath inter-county hurlers
Navan O'Mahoneys Gaelic footballers
Navan O'Mahoneys hurlers
Ballyforan Gaelic footballers
St Aidan's Gaelic footballers
Connacht inter-provincial hurlers
Four Roads hurlers